Kittery is a town in York County, Maine, United States. Home to the Portsmouth Naval Shipyard on Seavey's Island, Kittery includes Badger's Island, the seaside district of Kittery Point, and part of the Isles of Shoals. The southernmost town in the state, it is a tourist destination known for its many outlet stores.

Kittery is part of the Portland–South Portland–Biddeford, Maine metropolitan statistical area. The town's population was 10,070 at the 2020 census.

History

English settlement around the natural harbor of the Piscataqua River estuary began about 1623. By 1632 the community was protected by Fort William and Mary on today's New Hampshire side of the river; in 1689 defensive works that later became Fort McClary in Kittery Point were added on today's Maine side to the north.

Kittery was incorporated in 1647, staking a claim as the "oldest incorporated town in Maine." It was named after the birthplace of a founder, Alexander Shapleigh, from his manor of Kittery Court at Kingswear in Devon, England. Shapleigh arrived in 1635 aboard the ship Benediction, which he co-owned with another prominent settler, Captain Francis Champernowne, a cousin of Sir Ferdinando Gorges, lord proprietor of Maine. Together with the Pepperrell family, they established fisheries offshore at the Isles of Shoals, where fish were caught, salted, and exported to Europe. Other pioneers were hunters, trappers, and workers of the region's abundant timber. The settlement at the mouth of the Piscataqua River was protected by Fort McClary.

Thomas Spencer, Esquire, immigrant from Gloucestershire, England, is also a notable settler of Kittery with his wife Patience Chadbourne. Their story is included in The Maine Spencers: a history and genealogy, with mention of many associated families.'

Kittery originally extended from the Atlantic Ocean inland up the Salmon Falls River, including the present-day towns of Eliot, South Berwick, Berwick, and North Berwick. Located opposite Portsmouth, New Hampshire, the town developed into a center for trade and shipbuilding. In 1652, after the death of Gorges, Maine became part of the Massachusetts Bay Colony.

Francis Small was a pioneer resident of Kittery, and operated a trading post near the confluence of the Ossipee River and Saco River. Here major Indian trails converged—the Sokokis Trail (now Route 5), the Ossipee Trail (now Route 25), and the Pequawket Trail (now Route 113). The site supported the lucrative fur trade with Indians, but had the risks of living isolated in the wilderness. Small became the largest property owner in the history of Maine, and was known as "the great landowner".Sullivan, Gov. James, The History of the District of Maine, I. Thomas and E. T. Andrews, Publishers, Boston, MA, 1795.

In 1663, John Josselyn wrote: "Towns there are, are not many in this province. Kittery, situated not far from Passacataway (Portsmouth), is the most populous."

In 1705, during Queen Anne's War, tribes of the Wabanaki Confederacy raided the town, killing six residents and taking five prisoners.

During the Revolution, the first vessels of the U.S. Navy were constructed on Badger's Island, including the USS Ranger (1777) commanded by John Paul Jones. The Portsmouth Naval Shipyard, the nation's first federal navy yard, was established in 1800 on Fernald's Island. It connects to the mainland by two bridges. During the Civil War, the facility rebuilt the USS Constitution, and built the Civil War USS Kearsarge. Seavey's Island was annexed and became site of the now defunct Portsmouth Naval Prison.

Kittery has some fine early architecture, including the Sir William Pepperrell House, built in 1733, and the Lady Pepperrell House, built in 1760. The John Bray House, built in 1662, is believed to be the oldest surviving house in Maine. Located at the John Paul Jones Memorial Park on U.S. 1 is the Maine Sailors' and Soldiers' Memorial by Bashka Paeff. Further northeast up the road, the town has developed factory outlet shopping, very popular with tourists.

Kittery Point is home to Seapoint Beach and Fort Foster Park, originally a harbor defense. In 1905, The Treaty of Portsmouth, which formally ended the Russo-Japanese War, was signed at the shipyard.

From 1946 and 1977, when racial discrimination in public accommodations was common, Clayton and Hazel Sinclair operated the Rock Rest summer guest house in Kittery Point providing lodging to Black vacation travelers. The property was listed on the National Register of Historic Places in 2008. Rock Rest was featured in the 2020 documentary Driving While Black, that aired on PBS.

Geography
Situated beside the Gulf of Maine and Atlantic Ocean, Kittery is drained by Spruce Creek, Spinney Creek, Chauncey Creek, and the Piscataqua River.

The town is crossed by Interstate 95, U.S. Route 1, Maine State Route 101, Maine State Route 103, and Maine State Route 236.

DemographicsSee also Kittery (CDP), Maine and Kittery Point, Maine for village demographics2010 census
As of the census of 2010, there were 9,490 people, 4,302 households, and 2,488 families living in the town. The racial makeup of the town was 97.1% White, 0.01% African American, 0.1% Native American, 1.1% Asian, 0.1% Pacific Islander, 0.5% from other races, and 1.5% from two or more races. Hispanic or Latino of any race were 2.6% of the population.

There were 4,302 households, of which 23.5% had children under the age of 18 living with them, 46.3% were married couples living together, 7.9% had a female householder with no husband present, 3.6% had a male householder with no wife present, and 42.2% were non-families. 32.8% of all households were made up of individuals, and 12.6% had someone living alone who was 65 years of age or older. The average household size was 2.17 and the average family size was 2.77.

The median age in the town was 43.2 years. 18.2% of residents were under the age of 18; 7.8% were between the ages of 18 and 24; 26% were from 25 to 44; 30.3% were from 45 to 64; and 17.7% were 65 years of age or older. The gender makeup of the town was 48.3% male and 51.7% female.

2000 census
As of the census of 2000, there were 9,543 people, 4,078 households, and 2,528 families living in the town. The racial makeup of the town was 95.98% White, 1.78% Black or African American, 0.18% Native American, 0.65% Asian, 0.02% Pacific Islander, 0.45% from other races, and 0.94% from two or more races. Hispanic or Latino of any race were 1.50% of the population.

There were 4,078 households, out of which 27.7% had children under the age of 18 living with them, 50.1% were married couples living together, 8.6% had a female householder with no husband present, and 38.0% were non-families. 29.4% of all households were made up of individuals, and 10.6% had someone living alone who was 65 years of age or older.  The average household size was 2.29 and the average family size was 2.86.

In the town, the population was spread out, with 21.9% under the age of 18, 7.4% from 18 to 24, 30.7% from 25 to 44, 24.8% from 45 to 64, and 15.2% who were 65 years of age or older.  The median age was 39 years. For every 100 females, there were 94.8 males.  For every 100 females age 18 and over, there were 92.1 males.

The median income for a household in the town was $52,200, and the median income for a family was $53,343. Males had a median income of $37,096 versus $29,850 for females. The per capita income for the town was $24,153.  About 5.7% of families and 7.6% of the population were below the poverty line, including 11.9% of those under age 18 and 6.6% of those age 65 or over.

 Economy 
The Kittery economy is driven by the Portsmouth Naval Shipyard. In 2021, 438 shipyard workers lived in Kittery and were paid a combined $37,784,774. The shipyard's total economic impact on the whole region in 2021 was $1,322,611,898.

The Kittery Outlets is an outdoor shopping area located on Route 1 next to Interstate 95 with over 100 retailers, including national brands and local shops.

Kittery Foreside is a popular, walkable neighborhood adjacent to the Portsmouth Naval Shipyard that has many commercial businesses, including boutique shops, restaurants, and cafes. It also features historic homes, large shade trees, and a number of arts and culture organizations.

The Weathervane Restaurant chain was founded in Kittery in 1969.

Arts and culture
The Kittery Art Association was formed in 1958. It manages the KAA Gallery at 2 Walker Street in Kittery Foreside, as a cultural center and exhibition gallery. The Kittery Art Association purchased the gallery building in 2022 from the town library, where the property was known as the Taylor Building, for $558,700. The Kittery Art Association used to be located at 8 Coleman Avenue in Kittery Point.

The Rice Public Library was built in 1889 at 8 Wentworth Street. The library reopened in 2022 after a $6.1 million renovation. 

The nonprofit The Dance Hall is located in the former Grange Hall in Kittery Foreside. It hosts performances and classes in dance and music. 

Sites of interest

 Bray House
 Fort Foster Park
 Fort McClary State Historic Site
 John Paul Jones Memorial Park
 Lady Pepperell House
 Rock Rest
 William Pepperell House

 Parks and recreation 
Kittery includes many parks, beaches, and recreational spaces. The largest is Fort Foster, a former federal military installation from the 19th century until the 1950s. 

Other parks include 

 John Paul Jones Memorial Park
 Fort McClary State Historic Site
 Inspiration Park
 Rogers Park Conservation Area
 Kittery Memorial Field
 Seapoint Beach 

 Education 
Kittery is home to Robert William Traip Academy (9–12), a formerly private, preparatory school which became public and town-run in 1967. Kittery is also home to Horace Mitchell Primary School (K–3) and Shapleigh School (4–8).

Media
The movie Thinner (1996), based on the 1984 Stephen King novel, was filmed in Kittery.

Notable people

 Jess Abbott, guitarist of the band Now, Now
 William Badger, master shipbuilder
 Devin Beliveau, state representative
 John Haley Bellamy, woodcarver, folk artist
 George Berry, captain, shipbuilder
 Dennis C. Blair, admiral
 Scott Brown, ambassador, senator from Massachusetts (2010–2013)
 Tunis Craven, naval officer
 Shem Drowne, metalworker, creator of Boston's Grasshopper Weathervane
 Elisha T. Gardner, Wisconsin politician, lawyer
 William Dean Howells, writer, magazine editor
 Sandi Jackson, Chicago city alderman
 Kenneth F. Lemont, state legislator
 Jeremiah O'Brien, naval officer
 John O'Hurley, television actor and game show host
 Joseph T. Palastra Jr., U.S. Army General
 Sir William Pepperrell, merchant, soldier
 Arthur Shawcross, serial killer
 Hunt Slonem, artist
 Francis Small, trader and landowner
 Celia Thaxter, poet
 John Treworgie, last proprietary governor of Newfoundland
 Donald Valle (1908–1977), American businessman and owner of the eponymously named Valle's Steak House
 Walter Wheeler, state representative
 William Whipple, signer of the Declaration of Independence

In popular culture
The Saturday morning cartoon DinoSquad'' is based in Kittery/Kittery Point.

See also 

 Portsmouth Naval Shipyard
 National Register of Historic Places listings in York County, Maine
 Portsmouth Naval Prison

References

Further reading
 Stackpole, Everett S.  Old Kittery and its Families. Published 1903. Full image at books.google
 History of Whaleback Light 
 Seacoast Forts of Portsmouth Harbor from American Forts Network

External links

 Town of Kittery official website

 
Populated places established in 1623
Towns in York County, Maine
Portland metropolitan area, Maine
1623 establishments in the Thirteen Colonies
Populated coastal places in Maine
Towns in Maine